James Joseph Makin (22 June 1896 – 7 May 1977) was an Australian rules footballer who played with South Melbourne and Melbourne in the Victorian Football League (VFL).

Notes

External links 

 
Demonwiki profile

1896 births
1977 deaths
Australian rules footballers from Victoria (Australia)
Sydney Swans players
Melbourne Football Club players
People from North Melbourne